Don Weller may refer to:
 Don Weller (painter), American painter
 Don Weller (musician) (born 1940), British jazz musician